Siao Yu is a Taiwanese film directed by Sylvia Chang, written by Sylvia Chang and Ang Lee, starring Rene Liu in her debut film role, released in 1995.

Rene Liu was nominated for the Golden Horse Award Best Actress in 1994, and won the Asia-Pacific Film Festival Best Actress award in 1995.

Cast
Rene Liu (as “Joyin Liu”) as Lin Siao Yu
Marj Dusay as Rita
Tou Chung-hua as Giang Wei
Daniel J. Travanti as Mario Moretti
Connie Tai-Fung Hsia as Baoshu
Ajay Mehta as Photo clerk 
Daxing Zhang as Lao Chai
Joseph Ricca as Frank
Nunzio Sapienza as Mike
Stephen Daly as Tino
Di Cheng as Shelley

External links

 

1995 films
1995 drama films
1990s Cantonese-language films
1990s English-language films
Films based on Chinese novels
1990s Mandarin-language films
Films set in the United States
Films directed by Sylvia Chang
Central Motion Picture Corporation films
Films with screenplays by Ang Lee
Taiwanese drama films